A pyrosilicate is a type of chemical compound; either an ionic compound that contains the pyrosilicate anion , or an organic compound with the hexavalent  ≡-O-≡ group. The anion is also called disilicate or diorthosilicate.

Ionic pyrosilicates can be considered salts of the unstable pyrosilicic acid, .  Unlike the acid, the salts can be stable.  Indeed, pyrosilicates occur widely in nature as a class of silicate minerals, specifically the sorosilicates.

Some notable synthetic pyrosilicates include

 sodium pyrosilicate , a possible component of water glass.
 sodium iron(II) pyrosilicate , a potential cathode material for batteries.
 sodium manganese(II) pyrosilicate , another potential cathode material.

Structure
The pyrosilicate anion can be described as two  tetrahedra that share a vertex (an oxygen atom).  The vertices that are not shared carry a negative charge each.

The structure of solid sodium pyrosilicate was described by Volker Kahlenberg and others in 2010.

Yuri Smolin and Yuri Shepelev determined in 1970 the crystal structures of pyrosilicates of rare earth elements with generic formula , where "Ln" stands for either one of lanthanum, cerium, neodymium, samarium, europium, gadolinium, dysprosium, holmium, yttrium, erbium, thulium, or ytterbium.  They were found to belong to four distinct crystallographic classes, determined by the size of the cation.  Other researchers also studied yttrium pyrosilicate ., gadolinium pyrosilicate ., and  scandium pyrosilicate .

Preparation
Rare earth pyrosilicates  can be obtained by fusing the corresponding oxide  with silica in 1:2 molar ratio,  Single crystals can be grown by the Verneuil process or the Czochralski method.

References

Oxyanions
Sorosilicates